Cos or Kos was a city of ancient Greece on the island of the same name. In 366 BCE, the inhabitants of the town of Astypalaea abandoned their town to populate Cos. Cos was a member of the Dorian Pentapolis, whose sanctuary was on the Triopian promontory. Under the Athenian rule it had no walls, and it was first fortified by Alcibiades at the close of the Peloponnesian War. In subsequent times it shared the general fate of the neighbouring coasts and islands. Antoninus Pius rebuilt the city, after it had been destroyed by an earthquake. 

Its site is located near modern Kos.

References

Populated places in the ancient Aegean islands
Former populated places in Greece
Greek city-states
Ancient Greek cities
Cities in ancient Greece
Kos
360s BC establishments
Ancient Greek archaeological sites in Greece
Doric Hexapolis